Fluorine-19 nuclear magnetic resonance spectroscopy (fluorine NMR or 19F NMR) is an analytical technique used to detect and identify fluorine-containing compounds. 19F  is an important nucleus for NMR spectroscopy because of its receptivity and large chemical shift dispersion, which is greater than that for proton nuclear magnetic resonance spectroscopy.

Operational details
Consequently, this isotope is highly responsive to NMR measurements. Furthermore, 19F comprises 100% of naturally occurring fluorine. The only other highly sensitive spin  NMR-active nuclei that are monoisotopic (or nearly so) are 1H and 31P. Indeed, the 19F nucleus is the third most receptive NMR nucleus, after the 3H nucleus and 1H nucleus.

The 19F NMR chemical shifts span a range of ca. 800 ppm.  For organofluorine compounds the range is narrower, being ca. -50 to -70 ppm (for CF3 groups) to -200 to -220 ppm (for CH2F groups). The very wide spectral range can cause problems in recording spectra, such as poor data resolution and inaccurate integration.

It is also possible to record decoupled 19F{1H} and 1H{19F} spectra and multiple bond correlations 19F-13C HMBC and through space HOESY spectra.

Chemical shifts 
19F NMR chemical shifts in the literature vary strongly, commonly by over 1 ppm, even within the same solvent. Although the reference compound for 19F NMR spectroscopy, neat CFCl3 (0 ppm), has been used since the 1950s, clear instructions on how to measure and deploy it in routine measurements were not present until recently. An investigation of the factors influencing the chemical shift in fluorine NMR spectroscopy revealed the solvent to have the largest effect (Δδ = ±2 ppm or more). A solvent-specific reference table with 5 internal reference compounds has been prepared (CFCl3, C6H5F, PhCF3, C6F6 and CF3CO2H) to allow reproducible referencing with an accuracy of Δδ = ±30 ppb. As the chemical shift of CFCl3 is also affected by the solvent, care must be taken when using dissolved CFCl3 as reference compound with regards to the chemical shift of neat CFCl3 (0 ppm). Example of chemical shifts determined against neat CFCl3:

For a complete list the reference compounds chemical shifts in 11 deuterated solvents the reader is referred to the cited literature.

A concise list of appropriately referenced chemical shifts of over 240 fluorinated chemicals has also been recently provided.

Chemical shift prediction 
19F NMR chemical shifts are more difficult to predict than 1H NMR shifts. Specifically, 19F NMR shifts are strongly affected by contributions from electronic excited states whereas 1H NMR shifts are dominated by diamagnetic contributions.

Fluoromethyl compounds

Fluoroalkenes 

For vinylic fluorine substituents, the following formula allows for estimation of 19F chemical shfits:where Z is the statistical substituent chemical shift (SSCS) for the substituent in the listed position, and S is the interaction factor. Some representative values for use in this equation are provided in the table below:

Fluorobenzenes 

When determining the 19F chemical shifts of aromatic fluorine atoms, specifically phenyl fluorides, there is another equation that allows for an approximation. Adopted from "Structure Determination of Organic Compounds," this equation is:where Z is the SSCS value for a substituent in a given position relative to the fluorine atom. Some representative values for use in this equation are provided in the table below:

The data shown above are only representative of some trends and molecules. Other sources and data tables can be consulted for a more comprehensive list of trends in 19F chemical shifts. Something to note is that, historically, most literature sources switched the convention of using negatives. Therefore, be wary of the sign of values reported in other sources.

Spin-spin coupling 
19F-19F coupling constants are generally larger than 1H-1H coupling constants.  Long range 19F-19F coupling, (2J, 3J, 4J or even 5J) are commonly observed.  Generally, the longer range the coupling, the smaller the value. Hydrogen couples with fluorine, which is very typical to see in 19F spectrum.  With a geminal hydrogen, the coupling constants can be as large as 50 Hz.  Other nuclei can couple with fluorine, however, this can be prevented by running decoupled experiments. It is common to run fluorine NMRs with both carbon and proton decoupled. Fluorine atoms can also couple with each other.  Between fluorine atoms, homonuclear coupling constants are much larger than with hydrogen atoms.  Geminal fluorines usually have a J-value of 250-300 Hz.  There are many good references for coupling constant values.  The citations are included below.

Magnetic resonance imaging
19F magnetic resonance imaging (MRI) is a viable alternative to 1H MRI. The sensitivity issues can be overcome by using soft nanoparticles. Application include pH-, temperature-, enzyme-, metal ion- and redox responsive- contrast agents. They can also be used for long-term cell labelling.

Notes

References

Nuclear magnetic resonance
Fluorine